Sunday in New York was a 1961 American romantic comedy Broadway play written by Norman Krasna, produced by David Merrick, directed by Garson Kanin, and starring Robert Redford. It ran for 188 performances.

It was made into a 1963 film, Sunday in New York, starring Jane Fonda, Rod Taylor and Cliff Robertson. Krasna wrote the screenplay.

Cast 
 Pat Harrington, Sr. as Man	
 Conrad Janis as Adam Taylor	
 Sondra Lee as Woman	
 Ron Nicholas as Russell Wilson	
 Robert Redford as Mike Mitchell	
 Pat Stanley as Eileen Taylor

Reception 
The New York Times called it "inventive and chic. Only the substance is familiar and thin." Walter Kerr called it a "sentimentalised farce... precisely the kind of echo chamber exercise that drives intelligent young theatregoers to complete despair."

Redford later said he liked the jokes but felt the play was "not up to the standard of a Kanin-Gordon script". However the New York Times review was positive enough to ensure a semi-decent run and give Redford his first significant stage success.

The show closed in May 1962 after 189 performances.

The play ran for two years in Paris, and had a successful run in Los Angeles in a production starring Marlo Thomas.

Redford's appearance in the play would later help him be cast in Barefoot in the Park. It also contributed to George Roy Hill casting him in Butch Cassidy and the Sundance Kid because it gave Hill confidence Redford could handle comedy.

See also
List of American plays

References

Notes

External links 
 

1963 plays
American plays adapted into films